Orhan Demir (born 1954 in Istanbul, Turkey) is a Canadian jazz guitarist. 
His first release in 1986 "The way I see You" second release is in 1987 "North West",  third album was in 1989 "Windmill" in 1990 solo acoustic album "Sultan of Strings", followed by "Hot Cargo" in 1993, "Originals" in 1997, and "Guitar Plus" in 1998, Originals Vol.2 in 2018, Freedom in Jazz in 2019, Freedom in Jazz Vol.2 in 2020, Ziggurat DVD in 2021.
Orhan Demir recordings received great reviews from Jazz Times, Down Beat, Guitar World, Cadence, Options, Coda, Jazz Journal and others.

Brief Biography
Demir, born September 29, 1954, in Istanbul, immigrated to Canada in 1977.
His albums were cited by respected magazines such as ''DownBeat'.

Orhan Demir's style is an interesting blend of Be-Bop rhythms set against a middle-eastern scale played with a fast picking technique. He has been compared to Django Reinhardt.

Musicians
Orhan Demir - guitar
Neil Swainson - acoustic bass
Barry Elmes - drums
Rick Lazaroff - electric bass
Jack Vorvis - drums
Thomas Oreynicki - bass
Francois Briere - t. saxophone 
Perry Pansieri - drums

Selected discography
 The Way I See You (1986)
 Northwest (1988)
 Windmill (1989)
 Sultan Of Strings (1990)
 Hot Cargo (1993)
 Guitar Plus (1998)
 Originals (1997)
 Originals Vol.2, (2018)
 Freedom in Jazz, (2019)
 Freedom in Jazz, Vol.2 (2020)
 Ziggurat in 2021.
 Freedom in Jazz, Vol. 3 (2023).

References

External Links:

 Orhan Demir's Official Website: http://orhandemir.org 
 Barry Elmes Cornerstone Records artist page
 Neil Swainson Roadhouse Records artist page

1954 births
Living people
Canadian jazz guitarists
Canadian male guitarists
Musicians from Istanbul
Turkish emigrants to Canada
Canadian male jazz musicians